Acharya Shivpujan Sahay (9 August 1893 – 21 January 1963) was a noted Hindi and Bhojpuri novelist, editor and prose writer. He contributed in pioneering modern trends in, as well as in fiction. His texts "Mata ka Anchal" also printed in CBSE Book. In the text Mata ka Anchal, he has shown a wonderful bond with mother. He also conferred him with Padma Bhushan award by the Government of India.

Personal life 

Shivpujan Sahay was born in a  Kayastha family land-owning family in the Unwans village of Bhojpur District on 9 August 1893. His childhood name was 'Bholanath'.

Education and career
After his early education and a short stint as a Hindi language teacher at Ara (1903–1921), Acharya Shivpujan Sahay went to Kolkata to edit 'Marwari Sudhar' and then joined Matwala as an Editor in 1923. He moved to Lucknow in 1924 to join the editorial department of Dularelal Bhargava's Madhuri where he worked with noted Hindi author Munshi Premchand and edited his Rangbhumi and some of his other stories.

In 1925, he returned to Calcutta and engaged in editing short-lived journals such as Samanway, Mauji, Golmal, Upanyas Tarang. Finally, Sahay moved to Varanasi (Kāśi) in 1926 to work as a freelance editor. For a short period in 1931, he went to Sultanganj near Bhagalpur to edit Ganga. However, he returned to Varanasi in 1932 where he was commissioned to edit Jagaran, a literary fortnightly brought out by Jaishankar Prasad and his circle of friends. Sahay once again found himself working with Premchand. He also went on to become a prominent member of the Nagari Pracharini Sabha and similar literary circles in Varanasi.

In 1935, he moved to Laheria Sarai with his family (Darbhanga) to work as editor of Balak and other publications of Pustak Bhandar owned by Acharya Ramlochan Saran. In 1939, he joined Rajendra College, Chhapra as a Professor of Hindi Language. In 1946, on a year's leave, he moved to Patna to edit Himalaya, a literary monthly which was published by Pustak Bhandar owned by Acharya Ramlochan Saran.

In 1950, Sahay finally came to Patna to work as Secretary of Bihar Rashtra Bhasha Parished, a government academy where he edited and published more than 50  volumes of Hindi reference works. Later he became Director of the Parishad and compiled and edited Hindi Sahitya Aur Bihar a literary history. He retired from Parishad in 1959.

His own works were compiled and published in 4 volumes of Shipujan Rachanavali (1956–59) by the Parishad. Later, after his death, his complete works were edited and published by his son Prof. Mangal Murty as 'Shivapoojan Sahay Sahitya samagra'(2011) in 10 volumes.  Shivpujan Sahay is also remembered for his editing of several literary commemoration volumes, chiefly Dwivedi Abhinandan Granth (1933),Anugrah Abhinandan Granth (1946), Rajendra Abhinandan Granth (1950) and Jayanti Smarak Granth (1942). He also edited Dr. Rajendra Prasad's Atmakatha. He was awarded Padma Bhushan in 1960.

Works by Acharya Shivpujan Sahay

Stories and novels
Wey Din Wey Log – 1965
Bimb:Pratibimb – 1967
Mera Jeevan – 1985
Smritishesh – 1994
Hindi Bhasha Aur Sahitya – 1996
Gram Sudhar – 2007
Dehati Duniya – 1926
Vibhuti – 1935
Mera Bachapan – 1960
Amar Senani Veer Kunwar Singh- 1962
Mata ka anchal

Edited works
Dwivedi Abhinandan Granth – 1933
Rajendra Abhinandan Granth – 1950
Anugrah Abhinandan Granth – 1946
 Jayanti Smarak Granth – 1942
Bihar ki Mahilayen (Rajendra Abhinandan Granth) – 1962
Atmakatha – 1947
Rangbhumi – 1925
Samanway – 1925
Mauji – 1925
Golmaal- 1925
Jagaran – 1932
Balak – 1930
Himalaya- 1946
Hindi Sahitya Aur Bihar- 1962
Madhuri- 1924

Bhojpuri 

 Kundan Singh-Kesar Bai (Short Story)

Death

He died in Patna on 21 January 1963. His posthumously published books are Wey Din Wey Log (1965), Mera Jeevan (1985), Smritishesh (1994), Hindi Bhasha Aur Sahitya (1996), and Gram Sudhar (2007) and 'Shivapoojan Sahay Sahitya Samagra' (10 Vols.)

References

Further reading
Shivpujan Sahay by Mangal Murty, Published by Sahitya Academy, 35 Phirozshah Marg, New Delhi, India.
 ' Shivpujan Sahay : Pratinidhi Rachanayen' (Ed. Mangal Murty) Published by National Book Trust, New Delhi

External links 

 CM, Governor Pays Respect to Shivpujan Sahay – PatnaDaily.Com
 Acharya Shivpujan Sahay's Tribute

1893 births
1963 deaths
Hindi-language poets
Indian male novelists
Hindi-language writers
20th-century Indian novelists
Recipients of the Padma Bhushan in literature & education
Poets from Bihar
Assam academics
Novelists from Bihar
People from Bhojpur district, India
20th-century Indian male writers
Bhojpuri-language writers